Nashidha Mohamed is a Maldivian actress.

Career
Mohamed was first noticed by the owner of the production studio Corona Arts while he was attending an event held in Kulhudhuffushi, where she was performing onstage. Impressed with her appearance and dancing skills, he offered her to star in a video alongside Ahmed Asim.

Her next appearance was in Abdul Fattah's horror film Eynaa (2004), alongside Sheela Najeeb, Mohamed Manik, Ahmed Shah, Khadheeja Ibrahim Didi, and Ibrahim Jihad. The film garnered critical acclaim, especially for its technical team, and was a commercial success. She then stepped into Fathimath Nahula's critically and commercially successful romantic drama television series Kalaage Haqqugaa to portray the role of Zeena.

In April 2006, Ahmed Nimal's revenge thriller film Hiyani was released, featuring Mohamed in a small role. The film received mostly positive reviews from critics.

Mohamed's first release of 2010 was Ali Seezan's family drama Maafeh Neiy, alongside Ali Seezan and Niuma Mohamed. The film highlights many Maldivian social issues, including human rights abuses, forced marriage, and domestic violence. The film received mixed reviews from critics, the majority of whom dismissed its melodrama; it was a moderate success at the box office. Mohamed next appeared in Ali Shifau's family drama Dhin Veynuge Hithaamaigaa, once more alongside the Maldives' top female star Niuma Mohamed. The film and her performance received positive reviews from critics and was believed to be a "huge improvement" over recent Maldivian films; it proved to be another commercial success. The actress next starred opposite Sheela Najeeb, Mohamed Manik, and Yoosuf Shafeeu in Ahmed Nimal's horror film Zalzalaa En'buri Aun (2010), a spin-off of Aslam Rasheed's classic horror film Zalzalaa (2000). The film revolves around a mariage blanc, a man's murder by his wife, and the avenging of his death. The film received mixed responses from critics and did moderately well at the box office.

The following year, Mohamed played a small role in the Moomin Fuad-directed crime tragedy drama Loodhifa. Featuring an ensemble cast, the film deals with current social issues in Maldivian society told from the different perspective of each character. Made on a budget of MVR 600,000, the film was declared a commercial failure, though it received wide critical acclaim, praising the performance of the cast and the film's "realism" in its language, characters, and their attitudes. Mohamed next appeared in Ali Shifau's psychological romance thriller Zaharu alongside Ali Seezan, Niuma Mohamed, and Sheela Najeeb. The film centres around a married man who has a brief affair with a woman who becomes obsessed with him; it was inspired by the Adrian Lyne-directed American psychological erotic thriller Fatal Attraction (1987). Upon release, it received mixed reviews from critics and was declared a flop at the box office. The same year, the actress collaborated with Amjad Ibrahim on his family drama Hithey Dheymee, which received negative reviews from critics and was a box office disaster.

In 2017, Mohamed was cast alongside Yoosuf Shafeeu, Fathimath Azifa, and Jadhulla Ismail in the Mohamed Aboobakuru-directed Neydhen Vakivaakah, which was a critical and commercial failure.

2018 was a slow year for the Maldivian film industry due to the presidential election, and Mohamed only appeared in one film: a suspense thriller titled Dhevansoora, written and directed by Yoosuf Shafeeu. The production marks Shafeeu's thirtieth project and features an ensemble cast of twenty-one actors. The film received positive reviews from critics and was considered a "norm-breaker" for Maldivian cinema. Ahmed Hameed Adam, reviewing for VNews, wrote: "Though Mohamed has a small and deviated role in terms of its main plot, she makes an impact with her performance".

In 2019, Mohamed's first appearance was in Moomin Fuad's psychological horror thriller Nivairoalhi, which marked Niuma Mohamed's last film as an actress. The film received majorly positive reviews from critics; Aishath Maaha of Dho? favoured the performance of the lead actors and mentioned the "neat arrangement" of its screenplay, though pointing out its "weak ending".

Media image
In 2018, Mohamed was ranked ninth in Dho?'s list of Top Ten Actresses of Maldives, with writer Aishath Maaha opining that she is a "promising" actress who is still "relevant even during her long career".

Filmography

Film

Television

Short film

References

External links
 

Living people
People from Malé
21st-century Maldivian actresses
Maldivian film actresses
Year of birth missing (living people)